Timothy Amihere Mensah is a Ghanaian politician and member of the first parliament of the second republic of Ghana representing Nzema East Constituency under the membership of the People's Action Party (PAP).

Education and early life 
He was born in June 1916 in Western Region of Ghana. He obtained his Bachelor and Masters degree of Laws from University of Exeter, United Kingdom and he also attended Trinity Hall.

Politics 
Mensah was a Member of the First Parliament of the Second Republic of Ghana representing the Nzema East Constituency in the Western Region of Ghana on the ticket of the People's Action Party (PAP). He was elected in 1969 Ghanaian parliamentary election of the parliamentary term of the 1st Parliament of the 2nd Republic of Ghana. The Parliament started on 1 October 1969 and was suspended following the overthrow of the Busia government on 13 January 1972.

Personal life 
He was a Christian. He worked as a barrister.

See also 
Busia government
List of MPs elected in the 1969 Ghanaian parliamentary election

References 

20th-century Ghanaian lawyers
Ghanaian MPs 1969–1972
Progress Party (Ghana) politicians
1916 births
Year of death missing